Laternelaufen  ('Walking with Lanterns') is a German tradition for the time around St. Martin's Day. On 11 November (or later/earlier for reasons of appointment) children (usually in kindergarten and elementary school age) walk along the streets holding colourful, often self-made lanterns while singing traditional songs (Laternenumzug, 'Lantern Pageant'). Laternelaufen is slightly competing with Halloween, but they are different enough to coexist.

Memorial to St. Martin 
Legend has it that St. Martin, a soldier, gave a beggar the half of his soldier's coat to protect the man from freezing to death. Afterwards St. Martin became a bishop in order to help poor people. While this story is commonly known among German children and told in connection with this tradition, it does not explain the custom of promenading along the streets with lanterns. Several reasons why it is done this way can be found (s. Origin of the Tradition).

While Laternelaufen is a memorial to St. Martin and therefore usually takes place on 11 November, in some regions of Germany (that are rather Protestant) it may take place already on 10 November, because it is mixed up with the celebration of Martin Luther's birthday (Martinisingen). In some regions there is no fixed day. Depending on the needs of the particular organizers celebrations can often take place on different days in the same city. In Catholic regions Laternelaufen is also called Sankt Martinsumzug ('Saint Martin's Pageant') focusing on the aspect of sharing. In Austria, the same tradition is called Laternenfest.

During Laternelaufen children often sing Martinslieder / Martinilieder ('Martin songs') that glorify St. Martin's act of sharing or songs about their lanterns.

Origin 
It is not quite clear why the stories concerning St. Martin led to the custom of Laternelaufen. Maybe just like Advent wreaths Laternelaufen is a symbolic act of 'bringing light into the world'. It is also possible that one tradition got conflated with another or that the lanterns are remains of a necessary custom due to the lack of daylight in autumn and winter. Festivals of light (a category Laternelaufen could be classified into) can be found all over the world and in many cultures / traditions (e.g. Diwali, Chanukka, Saint Lucy's Day and Loi Krathong)

Organization 
Contemporary Laternelaufen is usually organized (privately) by parents or (publicly) by kindergartens and schools, parishes or even political parties. The ways often lead through forests (if any available in the neighbourhood) since there the streets are not continuously lit so that the lanterns are the only sources of light. The procession is accompanied by parents, group leaders etc., for official pageants the organizers often also hire somebody to play St. Martin, who is displayed as a bearded man in a medieval soldier's uniform wearing a long red cape or cloak, often riding on a horse in front of the children.

Comparison to Halloween 
Laternelaufen and Halloween cannot be compared although their celebration dates are around the same days (31 October and 11 November). Their origin is different and Laternelaufen does not contain any kind of masquerades, trick-or-treating or similar aspects that are commonly associated with Halloween.

External links 

 Popular songs sung by children while walking with lanterns 
 Laterne, Laterne ('Lantern, Lantern')
 Ich geh mit meiner Laterne ('I'm Walking with My Lantern')
 Durch die Straßen ('Through the Streets')

References 
 germany.info, website of the German Embassy in the USA, on Laternelaufen: The Celebration of St. Martin

German traditions
Autumn traditions
Autumn events in Germany